The fork-tailed drongo (Dicrurus adsimilis), also called the common drongo, African drongo or savanna drongo, is a small bird that can be found in a very substantial range, from the Sahel to South Africa, excepting the Congolian rainforests and Upper Guinean forests. They are a passerine, part of the family, Dicruridae, with four recognized subspecies. Physically this species is characterized with a narrow fork-shaped tail, red-brownish eyes, and black plumage throughout all of his body. As an omnivorous species, its diet consists of small insects, composing of butterflies, grasshoppers and beetles, besides fruit, including those of Azadirachta indica and Moringa oleifera.

The fork-tailed drongo is known for his ability to deceptively mimic other bird alarm calls in order for a certain animal to flee the scene so he can steal their food (kleptoparasitism). They are also notorious for displaying an aggressive and fearless behaviour by attacking and chasing off much larges animals, including birds of prey. When their nest or young are threatened. Due to its extensive range and stable population, the fork-tailed drongo is classified by the IUCN Red List as a least-concern species.

Taxonomy 
Its populations are genetically highly structured, and four races are accepted. The races D. a. modestus (Príncipe) together with D. a. coracinus and D. a. atactus (Bioko to west and central mainland Africa, from Guinea east to western Kenya and south to Angola) are usually split as a separate species, the velvet-mantled drongo, D. modestus (Hartlaub, 1849). 
 D. a. apivorus Clancey, 1976
Range: Gabon, Congo Republic, DRC, Angola, northwestern Zambia, Namibia, Botswana and northwestern South Africa
Description: primary remiges with brown outer vanes and pale inner vanes (noticeable while perched and in flight respectively)
Habitat: Arid savanna
 D. a. fugax W.K.H.Peters, 1868
Range: Uganda, Kenya, Tanzania and Zanzibar, southeastern Zambia, Malawi, Mozambique, Zimbabwe, Botswana, eastern Eswatini and northeastern South Africa
Description: Smaller than nominate, outer vanes of primaries brown, and inner vanes dark
 D. a. adsimilis (Bechstein, 1794)
Range: western Eswatini, Lesotho and eastern to southern South Africa
Description: Darker remiges, especially noticeable in flight
 D. a. jubaensis van Someren, 1931
Range: Ethiopia, Eritrea, and Somalia

Distribution and habitat
The fork-tailed drongo is a common and widespread resident breeder in Africa south of the Sahara. These insect-eating birds are usually found in open forests or bush, and are tolerant of arid climates. Its range was formerly considered to include Asia, but the Asian species is now called the black drongo (Dicrurus macrocercus).

Description
The fork-tailed drongo is 25 cm long and has short legs. They are medium sized and usually weigh about 50 grams. Males are mainly glossy black, although their wings are duller. Females are similar but less glossy. It is large-headed with well-developed rictal and nasal bristles, which are used as sensory organs. The rectrices curve outwards, forming the forked tail for which the species is named. The hooked bill is black and heavy, and the eye is red.

Calls
The call is a metallic . The fork-tailed drongo uses alarm calls to steal food from birds and animals such as meerkats. They make drongo-specific calls as well as mimicked calls. The mimicked calls help them while they target other animals that are eating food. The animals flee and leave their food behind. Once they are gone, the drongo steals it. Vocal at dawn and dusk.

Behavior 
They still-hunt by sitting very upright on a prominent perch, much like a shrike. They are usually solitary and form monogamous breeding pairs. They are aggressive and fearless, regularly mobbing or attacking much larger species, including birds of prey, if their nest or young are threatened or their territory is compromised. They also join mixed foraging bird parties, and will initiate mobbing of common enemies. To maintain their plumage condition they may rain-bathe, foliage-bathe or plunge-dive into water. Terrestrial foragers like babblers may use the drongo as a sentry.

Feeding
They are almost exclusively carnivorous, but may take nectar when available. They flycatch or take prey from the ground, and are attracted to bush fires. They also utilize disturbance caused by animals, and may perch on their backs. At times they catch ectoparasites on mammals, plunge-dive to catch fish, or kleptoparasitise mammals or birds.

Kleptoparasitism
Observations show that the fork-tailed drongo in Africa are capable of using deceptive mimicked alarm calls to steal food from birds like pied babblers and animals such as meerkats. Tom Flower observed that fork-tailed drongos spend a quarter of their time following other animals. Drongos sometimes act as sentries when a predator is approaching, warning their neighbours with genuine alarm calls. But drongos also earn a quarter of their daily calories by sounding a false alarm when another animal finds food. When the meerkats and babblers flee from the non-existent predator, the drongo steals their food. Though in doubt, researchers have considered the possibility that these drongos possess theory of mind, not fully shown in any animal other than humans.

Nesting
Two to four eggs are laid in a cup nest in a fork high in a tree. Drongos are commonly used as brood hosts for the African cuckoos (21.8% of nests), in the Kalahari Desert was found that Jacobin cuckoos also parasite the drongo.

Conservation status
Due to their very large range, stable population trend and size, the fork-tailed drongo is considered to be a least-concern species by the IUCN Red List.

Gallery

References

Further reading
 African Bird Club (2006) ABC African Checklist: Passerines. Accessed 16/01/08.
 Birds of The Gambia by Barlow, Wacher and Disley, 
 Sinclair, Ian & Ryan, Peter (2003) Birds of Africa south of the Sahara, Struik, Cape Town.

External links

 Fork-tailed Drongo - Species text in The Atlas of Southern African Birds.
 Fork-tailed drongo videos, photos & sounds on the Internet Bird Collection

fork-tailed drongo
Birds of Sub-Saharan Africa
fork-tailed drongo
fork-tailed drongo]